Ouston is a village and former civil parish, now in the parish of Stamfordham, in the county of Northumberland, England. In 1951 the parish had a population of 13.

Ouston lies near the course of Hadrian's Wall, probably the most noted Roman monument in Britain.

Governance 
Ouston was formerly a township in Stamfordham parish, from 1866 Ouston was a civil parish in its own right until it was abolished on 1 April 1955 to form Stamfordham.

See also
RAF Ouston

References 

Villages in Northumberland
Former civil parishes in Northumberland
Stamfordham